Aiwo may refer to:

 Aiwo District
 Aiwo Constituency